Under the Table & Above the Sun is the third studio album by Red Dirt artist Reckless Kelly, and their second with Sugar Hill Records.

Track listing
"Let's Just Fall" - 2:57
"Nobody's Girl" - 3:02
"Desolation Angels" - 5:11
"Everybody" - 4:13
"I Saw It Coming" - 3:12
"Vancouver" - 3:54
"Willamina" - 4:02
"Mersey Beat" - 3:41
"Set Me Free" - 4:24
"Snowfall" - 3:21
"You Don't Want Me Around" - 2:31
"May Peace Find You Tonight" - 3:58

Chart positions

References

2003 albums
Reckless Kelly (band) albums